Lovers is a South Korean television series starring Kim Jung-eun and Lee Seo-jin who play a plastic surgeon and a gangster who enter into an unlikely romance. The series is based on the Lee Man-hee stage play Turn Around and Leave, the same work that inspired the 1998 blockbuster film A Promise starring Jeon Do-yeon and Park Shin-yang. It aired on SBS from November 8, 2006 to January 11, 2007 on Wednesdays and Thursdays at 21:55 for 20 episodes.

It is the third and final installment of the "Lovers" trilogy by writer Kim Eun-sook and director Shin Woo-chul. Unlike previous installments Lovers in Paris (which Kim also starred in) and Lovers in Prague which were partly shot in Europe, Lovers filmed on location in China's Hainan Island.

Synopsis
Yoon Mi-ju (Kim Jung-eun) is the daughter of a reverend, who has adopted many children and set up an orphanage, and works as a plastic surgeon in a hospital, although her dream is to open a clinic of her own. Ha Kang-jae (Lee Seo-jin) is an orphan raised by Kang Choong-shik, a gangland boss, and his trusty right hand. The two meet when Mi-ju mistakes Kang-jae for her adoptive sister's former boyfriend, who dumped her after discovering she was pregnant; as Mi-ju learns a little later, Kang-jae is actually in a relationship with Park Yu-jin (Kim Gyu-ri), Mi-ju's neighbor. Kang-jae is also the potential buyer for the land that houses Reverend Yoon's orphanage, and that Mi-ju wants to sell, not knowing that the land and the house are at risk for seizure because of his father. When Kang-jae is wounded by some Chinese gangsters, Mi-ju treats him and he begins to fall for her; meanwhile, Kang Se-yeon (Jung Chan), son of the boss Kang-jae works for, falls in love with Mi-ju, who his mother wants as a daughter in law because she considers her a good catch.

Cast

Main
Lee Seo-jin as Ha Kang-jae 
34 years old, orphan, gangster, right hand of gang boss Kang Choong-shik who raised him 
Kim Jung-eun as Yoon Mi-ju 
31 years old, reverend's daughter, plastic surgeon, supports her father and his orphanage
Jung Chan as Kang Se-yeon
33 years old, Kang Choong-shik's son, MBA educated, who returns to Korea after years spent abroad
Kim Gyu-ri as Park Yu-jin
28 years old, owner of bakery, Kang-jae's girlfirend, Seo-yeon's first love

Others
Kim Nam-gil as Tae-san, Kang-jae's subordinate
Yeon Mi-joo as Choi Yoon, Se-yeon's assistant 
Lee Ki-young as Uhm Sang-taek, Kang-jae's right hand
Park In-hwan as Reverend Yoon Mok-sa, Mi-ju's father
Choi Ha-na as Hong Soon-jung, nurse in plastic surgery clinic, later living with Mi-ju
Yoo Jung-hyun as Seol Won-chul, plastic surgery clinic president
Choi Il-hwa as Kang Choong-shik, gang boss turned Chairman & CEO Baek Eun Construction
Yang Geum-seok as Jung Yang-geum, Se-yeon's mother, Kang Choong-shik's wife
Kim Roi-ha as Nam Chang-bae, gangster, nightclub president
Jang Hang-sun as Baek Jong-dae, Baek Eun Construction Director
Lee Se-chang as Lee Jin-soo, garage owner, tire dealer
Moon Jeong-hee as Sang-taek's wife
Kim Ki-bang

Ratings
In the table below, the blue numbers represent the lowest ratings and the red numbers represent the highest ratings.

Source: TNS Media Korea

See also
List of Korean television shows
Contemporary culture of South Korea

References

External links
 

Seoul Broadcasting System television dramas
2006 South Korean television series debuts
2007 South Korean television series endings
Korean-language television shows
South Korean romance television series
Television shows written by Kim Eun-sook